The Abraham Park Kenneth Vine Collection, also known as the Pyung Kang Biblical Archaeology Museum is a privately owned museum established by Rev.

Abraham Yoon-sik Park, the senior pastor of Pyungkang Cheil Presbyterian Church and the author of the History of Redemption Series and Dr Kenneth Vine, an American biblical archaeologist and former president of Loma Linda University, California, United States.  It is currently situated in Oryu-dong, Guro-gu, Seoul, South Korea, adjacent to Pyungkang Cheil Presbyterian Church, one of the largest Presbyterian churches in South Korea.

History
The museum first opened its doors to the public in November 1998.  Dr Kenneth Vine initially planned on giving his collection to his only son however, when his son died in a car accident he donated his collection of artefacts to the founder of Pyungkang Cheil Presbyterian Church, Rev. Abraham Yoon-sik Park and together they established The Abraham Park Kenneth Vine Collection next to Pyungkang Cheil Presbyterian Church.

Exhibiting thousands of years of history, The Abraham Park Kenneth Vine Collection merges the world of archaeology and religion together in a collection of Egyptian and Middle Eastern artifacts. With objects dating back to 6,000 years, it is one of the few places in Korea where such artifacts are on display as part of a permanent collection.

See also
List of museums in Seoul
List of museums in South Korea

References

External links
 Museum website
 르포라이터 민병준의 향토기행: 서울 4 남서부 

Museums established in 1998
Buildings and structures in Guro District, Seoul
Museums in Seoul
Religious museums in South Korea
Archaeological museums in South Korea
Christianity in South Korea
1998 establishments in South Korea
Religion in Seoul